The 1995 Calgary Stampeders finished in first place in the North Division with a 15–3 record. They appeared in the 83rd Grey Cup but lost to the Baltimore Stallions. That Grey Cup game marked the only time an American-based team won the Grey Cup.

Offseason

CFL Draft

Preseason

Regular season

Season Standings

Season schedule

Awards and records
Jeff Nicklin Memorial Trophy – Dave Sapunjis (SB)

1995 CFL All-Stars

Northern All-Star Selections

Playoffs

North Semi-Final
Due to the unbalanced divisional alignment used this season as well as the league's preference to maintain regional rivalries, some North Division teams did not play one another in the regular season, including Calgary and Hamilton. Their 1995 North Division Semi-Final remains the only non-Grey Cup postseason game in the history of professional Canadian football to be played between teams that did not face one another in the regular season.

North Final

Grey Cup

References

Calgary Stampeders seasons
Calgary Stampeders Season, 1995
N. J. Taylor Trophy championship seasons